David Adler may refer to:

 David B. Adler (1826–1878), Danish banker and politician
 David Adler (architect) (1882–1949), American architect
 David Adler (physicist) (1935–1987), American physicist
 David A. Adler (born 1947), American author 
 the pseudonym of American screenwriter Frank Tarloff

See also
 Adler (surname), a surname
 Adler (disambiguation)